Chamath Perera (born 13 May 1969) is a Sri Lankan former cricketer. He played in 59 first-class and 10 List A matches between 1989/90 and 2003/04. He made his Twenty20 debut on 17 August 2004, for Panadura Sports Club in the 2004 SLC Twenty20 Tournament.

References

External links
 

1969 births
Living people
Sri Lankan cricketers
Burgher Recreation Club cricketers
Moratuwa Sports Club cricketers
Panadura Sports Club cricketers
Place of birth missing (living people)